The Lightweight Medium Machine Gun (LWMMG) is a prototype machine gun being developed first by General Dynamics, later by LoneStar Future Weapons, now by True Velocity

Design
The LWMMG is designed to fill the gap between 7.62 mm and .50 BMG machine guns. The weapon uses the .338 Norma Magnum round, giving it greater lethality and double the range of the 7.62 NATO round. It weighs , making it only slightly heavier than the M240L, and  lighter than the M240B. An individual round is twice as heavy (45.5 grams compared to 24 grams), as are each belt link (8 grams compared to 4 grams). For each weapon to fire for one minute, the standard LWMMG weighing  plus a belt of 500 .338NM rounds would weigh , while an M240B weighting  plus a belt of 800 7.62 NATO rounds would weigh . The LWMMG is operated by a gas-operated, long-stroke piston with a rotating bolt located under the barrel and fires from an open bolt. It uses “Short Recoil Impulse Averaging” technology, patented by General Dynamics and previously used on their XM806 machine gun, where the entire barrel, barrel extension, gas system, and bolt assembly recoil inside the outer housing. The LWMMG is equipped with a quick-change barrel, quad picatinny rails, collapsible stock, and can be used by dismounted troops or mounted on a platform.

The LWMMG is pitched as being a bridge between 7.62 NATO and .50 BMG machine guns. While the M240 has an effective range of 1,100 m, the LWMMG fires a  .338 bullet that can provide effective and accurate fire out to 1,700 m. General Dynamics officials say their machine gun is not meant to be a replacement for the M240, but to give the ability to put effective fire on targets at extended ranges. The LWMMG can be mounted on an M240 mount and costs about the same. While the company is satisfied with the shorter .338NM cartridge's performance, the gun could easily be converted to .338 Lapua Magnum. The gun's short recoil operating system causes the barrel to reciprocate, similar to the M2 machine gun. This combined with a gas system to minimize recoil balances positive and negative recoil forces, allowing a gunner to fire a round with significantly greater energy but with the recoil profile similar to a 7.62 mm round from an M240.

History
General Dynamics first realized the capability gap being experienced by U.S. forces in Afghanistan around 2010. In many cases, troops were on low ground and being engaged by PKM machine gun fire from the high ground, forcing them to return fire from where they were instead of being able to seek a better position. The M2 .50-caliber machine gun is too heavy for use by dismounted patrols, and rounds from an M240 begin to drift off-target at 800 meters, especially when shooting upwards. At closer ranges, an M240 is accurate but does not have enough penetrating power against hard structures. The Precision Sniper Rifle competition going on at that time also showed the U.S. military was interested in infantry weapons with a 1,500-meter range. To achieve desired range capabilities, the .338-caliber was chosen, specifically the .338 Norma Magnum over the .338 Lapua Magnum for several reasons including greater barrel life and a less tapered case for better use in a push-through design metallic disintegrating link. A machine gun was then designed around the concept with Short Recoil Impulse Averaging technology, uses available subsystem components to keep cost down, and has a broad view 6-power scope to enable point target engagement out to 1,000-1,200 meters. The development of prototypes was entirely company-funded and took 12 months. The LWMMG was first unveiled on 15 May 2012 at the Joint Armaments Conference in Seattle, Washington.

Previously, the gun underwent a firing demonstration with special operations elements at Camp Roberts, California. At that range, a .50 caliber machine gun is designed to be an area weapon and could only fire accurately with single shots, while the LWMMG can maintain accurate automatic fire beyond what the .50 Cal is capable of. This showed the weapon's significance of hitting targets at longer ranges than what an M240 can do that would require the use of a vehicle-mounted .50 caliber weapon. A demonstration firing of the LWMMG is expected to take place in late October at Fort Benning, Georgia.

In April 2021 the technical data package for the LWMMG was sold to LoneStar Future Weapons.

In November 2021 True Velocity Ammo acquired LoneStar Future Weapons

See also
LSAT light machine gun
QJY-201
Overmatch

References

External links
LWMMG factsheet - General Dynamics
A new machine gun-the right weapon for today's environment
.338 Medium Machine Gun Suppressor Test Results
"Distinct Overmatch on the Current and Future Battlefield"
General Dynamics Ordnance & Tactical Systems .338 Machine Gun
LIGHTWEIGHT MEDIUM MACHINE GUN: Unmatched accuracy and extended range

General Dynamics
Machine guns of the United States
8 mm machine guns
Medium machine guns